The men's 400m freestyle events at the 2022 World Para Swimming Championships were held at the Penteada Olympic Swimming Complex in Madeira between 12 and 18 June.

Medalists

Results

S6
Final
Six swimmers from five nations took part.

S7
Final
Seven swimmers from six nations took part.

S8
Final
Eight swimmers from six nations took part.

S9

S10

S11

S13

References

2022 World Para Swimming Championships